The 1904 Melbourne Cup was a two-mile Group One handicap horse race which took place on Tuesday, 1 November 1904.

Franklyn Barrett filmed the Melbourne Cup. This was the first time the Melbourne Cup had been filmed from start to finish.

The placegetters were:

See also

 Melbourne Cup
 List of Melbourne Cup winners
 Victoria Racing Club

References

External links
1904 Melbourne Cup footyjumpers.com

1904
Melbourne Cup
Melbourne Cup
20th century in Melbourne
1900s in Melbourne